The partido of Tres Arroyos is a subdivision of the Province of Buenos Aires in Argentina. On the Atlantic coast of the province, it was created in 1882 by the provincial government when they divided the territory of Tres Arroyos into the partidos of Coronel Suárez, Tres Arroyos and Coronel Pringles.

Settlements

Barrow:
Claromecó
Dunamar
Copetonas
Lin Calel
Micaela Cascallares
Orense

San Francisco De Bellocq
San Mayol
Tres Arroyos
Villa Rodríguez
Rural diaspora

Sport

Tres Arroyos is home of Huracán de Tres Arroyos Huracán de Tres Arroyos, a local institution with a professional football team that play in the third category of the Argentine football (Argentino A).

In 2004-2005 Huracán TA played in the First Division of Argentine football, in an historic event for a small country city club.

External links

 
 The Portal Of Tres Arroyos  (Spanish)
 Tres Arroyos City (Spanish)
  Tres Arroyos Website (Spanish)

1884 establishments in Argentina
Partidos of Buenos Aires Province